Midnight Souvenirs is the seventh solo album by Peter Wolf. It won the award for Album of the Year at the 2010 Boston Music Awards,  was No. 27 on Rolling Stones list of the 30 Best Albums of 2010. It peaked at No. 45 on the Billboard 200. The album has sold 42,000 copies in the United States as of March 2016.

Eight of the album's songs were co-written with Will Jennings. The track "Thick as Thieves" is a re-imagining of a track from Wolf's second solo album, Come as You Are. Wolf created the album's artwork himself.

Track listing
 "Tragedy" (with Shelby Lynne) (Peter Wolf, Angelo Petraglia) - 4:30
 "I Don't Wanna Know" (David Johnston) - 2:54
 "Watch Her Move" (Wolf, Taylor Rhodes) - 3:58
 "There's Still Time" (Will Jennings, Wolf, Bob Thiele, Jr.) - 5:09
 "Lying Low" (Jennings, Wolf) - 3:12
 "The Green Fields of Summer" (with Neko Case) (Jennings, Wolf) - 2:57
 "Thick as Thieves" (Wolf, Tim Mayer) - 2:44
 "Always Asking for You" (Jennings, Mayer) - 2:58
 "Then It Leaves Us All Behind" (Jennings, Mayer) - 3:33
 "Overnight Lows" (Wolf, Petraglia, Chuck Prophet) - 5:07
 "Everything I Do Gonna Be Funky" (Allen Toussaint) - 2:14
 "Don't Try and Change Her" (Jennings, Mayer) - 3:33
 "The Night Comes Down (For Willy DeVille)" (Jennings, Mayer) - 3:57
 "It's Too Late For Me" (with Merle Haggard) (Jennings, Mayer) - 2:47

Charts

References

2010 albums
Peter Wolf albums
Verve Records albums